9-1-1 is an American television series that originally began broadcasting on January 3, 2018, on Fox.

Overview

Main characters
 Angela Bassett as Athena Grant–Nash (née Carter), LAPD patrol sergeant, mother of May and Harry from her first marriage to Michael Grant. Athena and Michael divorce in the first season.  At the end of season one, she began dating Bobby Nash and becomes Bobby's wife at the end of the second season. Pepi Sonuga portrays a younger Athena during an episode of season 3, in which she discovers that the weapon used to murder her fiancé has been found. 
 Peter Krause as Robert "Bobby" Nash, LAFD Station 118 captain and later Athena's husband. Before arriving at Los Angeles, Bobby lived in Minnesota where his wife and two kids died in a fire. 
 Oliver Stark as Evan "Buck" Buckley, firefighter and Maddie's younger brother. Buck was a womanizer at first, but after meeting Abby he started looking for serious relationships.
 Aisha Hinds as Henrietta "Hen" Wilson, firefighter/paramedic. She is married to Karen and together they have a son named Denny.
 Kenneth Choi as Howard "Howie"/"Chimney" Han, firefighter/paramedic and Maddie's partner. At the end of season three they find out Maddie is pregnant and they now have a daughter together. He grew up in the Los Angeles area with his mother while his father returned to South Korea. As a result, he has a very testy relationship with his father, especially after the elder Mr. Han openly expressed his disappointment in his chosen profession. He has a younger half-brother named Albert, who secretly left South Korea to escape their father's control and lived with him for a while.
 Rockmond Dunbar as Michael Grant, Athena's ex-husband. The two amicably divorce after he comes out as gay. He and Athena remain close friends and confidants, and the friendship extended to her new husband Bobby. He leaves Los Angeles with his boyfriend David to Haiti after David decides to go see how a storm destroyed that country. (season 1–5)
 Connie Britton as Abigail "Abby" Clark, 911 operator. Abby leaves at the end of season one to travel the world following her mother's passing. She never came back to Los Angeles until the season 3 finale to give Buck closure. She ended up engaged and living in Arizona. (season 1; special guest season 3)
 Jennifer Love Hewitt as Maddie Buckley Kendall, 911 operator, Buck's sister, and Chimney's partner. Maddie was in an abusive marriage and ended up killing her husband Doug Kendall in self defence after he stabbed Chimney and kidnapped her. At the end of season three she finds out she is pregnant with her and Chimney's first child. In season 5, Maddie leaves Chimney and their baby because she doesn't think she would be a good mother for the baby. (season 2 – present)
 Ryan Guzman as Edmundo "Eddie" Diaz, firefighter. He joined the 118 fresh out of the academy. A Texas native, he served in the United States Army as a combat medic and moved to Los Angeles after being discharged. He served in Afghanistan and his combat experience is shown through his ability to think quickly on his feet even under duress with minimal back-up. He is a single father and has a son named Christopher. (season 2 – present)
 Corinne Massiah as May Grant, Athena and Michael's daughter. Graduates high school at the end of season three. Begins training as a 911 operator in season 4. (Season 2 – present; recurring season 1)
 Marcanthonee Jon Reis as Harry Grant, Athena and Michael's son (season 2 – 6; recurring season 1)
 Gavin McHugh as Christopher Diaz, Eddie's son. (season 3 – present; recurring season 2)
 John Harlan Kim as Albert Han, Chimney's half-brother. (season 4; guest seasons 3, 5)

Recurring characters
This is a list of recurring actors and the characters they portrayed in multiple episodes, which were significant roles, sometimes across multiple seasons.

Introduced in season one
 Mariette Hartley as Patricia Clark, Abby's mother, who suffers from Alzheimer's. She passes away in the penultimate episode of season 1
 Gavin Stenhouse as Priest
 Alex Loynaz as Terry Flores, 911 technician
 Cocoa Brown as Carla Price, Abby's mother's nurse and later a nanny for Christopher Diaz
 Claudia Christian as Captain Elaine Maynard, Athena's direct superior at the LAPD
 Tracie Thoms as Karen Wilson, Hen's wife
 Abby Brammell as Eva Mathis, Hen's ex-girlfriend
 Declan Pratt as Denny Wilson, Hen and Karen's son
 Debra Christofferson as Sue Blevins, 911 call center manager
 Michelle Bernard as Officer Carol Branford, an LAPD constable under Athena's command

Introduced in season two
 Chiquita Fuller as Linda Bates, 911 operator
 Bryan Safi as Josh Russo, 911 dispatch's supervisor and training officer and Maddie’s best friend
 Tiffany Dupont as Ali Martin, Buck's girlfriend who left him off-screen before season 3 premiered
 Jonathan Grebe as John, a paramedic
 Ana Mercedes as Isabel Diaz, Eddie's grandmother
 Devin Kelley as Shannon Diaz, Eddie's estranged wife and Christopher's mother who is later killed off in a road accident
 Rick Chambers as Dwight Meyerson, a news reporter
 Lou Ferrigno Jr. as Tommy Kinard - a firefighter with the 118 prior to 2005 up to some time prior to 2018, when he moved to the aerial division - 217
 Brian Thompson as Captain Vincent Gerrard - the captain of the 118 prior to 2005 up to 2008 when he was dismissed for racial prejudice.
 Brian Hallisay as Doug Kendall / Jason Bailey, Maddie's abusive ex-husband (Brian Hallisay is Jennifer Love Hewitt's husband)
 Megan West as Taylor Kelly, a TV reporter who dates Buck in season 2, then resumes their relationship in season 4 and appears in season 5.
 Danny Nucci as Detective Rick Romero.

Introduced in season three
 Chris Wu as Officer Williams, an LAPD constable under Athena's command
 Ronda Rousey as Firefighter Lena Bosko
 Leonard Roberts as Captain Ronnie Cooper
 Theo Breaux as Firefighter Stover
 Joe Pistone as Firefighter Calley
 Peter Jang as Firefighter Logan
 Ashwin Gore as Jamal Momed, 911 Operator
 Sean Kleier as Greg, an armed robber who seduces Josh in order to clone his access card and hold dispatch hostage
 Gabrielle Walsh as Ana Flores, Christopher's teacher in Season 3. She dated Eddie in season 4 and season 5, until he broke up with her.
 Sasha Roiz as Detective Lou Ransone, a colleague of Athena, who reappears in season 4 and season 5 and is injured by the serial rapist who attacked Athena.

Introduced in season four
 Margot Terry as Nia, a young girl Hen and Karen foster
 Anirudh Pisharody as Ravi Panikkar, a probationary firefighter with the 118 who appears sporadically in season 4, became a regular in season 5
 Marsha Warfield as Toni Wilson, Hen's mother

Introduced in season five 
 Vanessa Estelle Williams as Claudette Collins, an outspoken call center veteran, who transfers back to the LA station, intimidating May Grant.
 Bryce Durfee as Jonah Greenway, a new paramedic filling in for Chimney at Station 118, who is later revealed to have been a serial killer.
 Arielle Kebbel as Lucy Donato, a new firefighter filling in for Eddie at Station 118.

Guest stars
The following is a supplementary list of guest stars, some recurring, who appear in lesser roles.

Introduced in season one
 John Marshall Jones as Dave Morrisey
 Rachel Breitag as Tatiana, Chimney's ex-girlfriend
 Troy Ian Hall as Police Officer
 Doug Savant as Matthew Clark, Abby's brother
 Wolé Parks as Glenn, Michael's ex-boyfriend; later replaced by Reggie Austin in season 2
 Genneya Walton as Laila Creedy
 Brielle Barbusca as Cooper
 Josephine Lawrence as Georgina
 Noelle E. Parker as Brook Nash, Bobby's late daughter
 London Cheshire as Robert Nash Jr., Bobby's late son
 Laura Allen as Marcy Nash, Bobby's late wife
 Colby French as Detective Andy Marks
 Jennifer Aspen as Lorraine, an insurance fraudster and former porch pirate
 Todd Williams as Aaron Brooks, Athena's ex-boyfriend

Introduced in season two
 Connor Trinneer as Jessie
 Eric Nenninger as Brian
 Ali Hillis as Jen
 T. J. Linnard as Russ
 Romi Dias as Chief Miranda Williams
 Connor Dean as Tucker
 Nev Scharrel as Kat
 Kendra Chell as Ainsley
 Burt Grinstead as Drew Hudson
 Terri Hoyos as Aunt Josephina, Eddie's aunt
 Christine Estabrook as Gloria Wagner, a 911 dispatcher fired for negligence
 Justin James Farley as Bret
 Romy Rosemont as Lola Peterson
 Daniel Roebuck as Norman Peterson
 Gino Anthony Pesi as Sal Deluca, a firefighter with the 118 prior to 2008 until he was transferred to the 122 by Bobby for insubordination
 Mark Derwin as Captain Thomas
 Tyler Ross as Brandon Skinner
 Beverly Todd as Beatrice Carter, Athena's mother
 Joseph Lyle Taylor as Marty Collins, the 118's resident mechanic
 Lauren Stamile as Ellie Costas
 Anthony Turpel as Freddie Costas, a serial bomber who tries to kill Athena and Bobby for jailing his late father over an insurance fraud fire
 Michael Whaley as Commander Bowman
 Julian Works as Marvin Chavez, cousin of Mateo Chavez (Austin firefighter, station 126)

Introduced in season three
 William Russ as Chuck
 Ava Acres as Charlotte
 Brian Tichnell as Max Green
 Elia Cantu as Stacy Green
 Deborah Strang as Adele Summers
 Conor Romero as Jason Summers
 Ellen Hollman as Tara, a domestic abuse victim Maddie tries unsuccessfully to help
 Jordan Belfi as Chase Mackey
 Scott Speiser as Vincent
 Jayson Blair as Jake
 Rumer Willis as Georgia

Introduced in season four
 Nikki DeLoach as Janell Hansen
 Vanessa Marano as Sydney
 Gregory Harrison as Phillip Buckley
 Dee Wallace as Margaret Buckley
 Leah Pipes as Molly

Notes

References

9-1-1 (TV series)
9-1-1